The Truth: An Uncomfortable Book About Relationships is an autobiographical book written by investigative reporter Neil Strauss, covering his attempts to form and maintain a long-term relationship following his years in the seduction community.

The Truth is a follow-up to Strauss's earlier The Game (2005), which chronicled his years in the seduction community. The Truth was published in a similar format to The Game, and features a contrasting white faux leather cover; it was provisionally titled Game Over.

Reception
Reviews were published in Grantland and The Chicago Tribune.

References

External links
 

2015 non-fiction books
Self-help books
Fratire books
Seduction community
Dey Street books